The North Carolina Council of State elections of 2024 are scheduled to be held on November 5, 2024, to select the ten officers of the North Carolina Council of State. These elections coincide with the presidential election, elections to the House of Representatives, elections to the North Carolina General Assembly and top state courts. Primary elections are scheduled for March 5, 2024, for offices for which more than one candidate filed per party.

The ten members of the North Carolina Council of State are statewide-elected officers serving four-year terms.

The 2020 elections resulted in a Council of State consisting of 4 Democrats and 6 Republicans.

Governor

Incumbent Governor Roy Cooper, a Democrat, is prevented by the state constitution from running for a third consecutive term.

Lieutenant Governor

Incumbent Lt. Gov. Mark Robinson, a Republican, is eligible to run for a second term, but has expressed interest in running for Governor instead.

State Representative Raymond Smith Jr., a Democrat, has announced plans to run for the office in 2024.

Attorney General

Incumbent Attorney General Josh Stein, a Democrat, is eligible to run for a third term, but has decided instead to run for governor.

Secretary of State

Incumbent Secretary of State Elaine Marshall, a Democrat, is eligible to run for an eighth term.

Democratic primary

Candidates

Potential
Elaine Marshall, Secretary of State (1997–present)

Republican primary

Candidates

Declared
Chad Brown, Gaston County Commissioner and Candidate for Secretary of State in 2020

General election

State Auditor

Incumbent Auditor Beth Wood, a Democrat, is eligible to run for a fifth term.

Democratic primary

Candidates

Potential
Beth Wood, State Auditor (2009–present)

Republican primary

General election

State Treasurer

Incumbent Treasurer Dale Folwell, a Republican, is eligible to run for a third term, but has expressed interest in running for Governor instead.

Democratic primary

Republican primary

Candidates

Potential
Dale Folwell, State Treasurer (2017–present)

General election

Superintendent of Public Instruction
Incumbent Catherine Truitt is eligible to run for a second term.

Democratic primary

Republican primary

Candidates

Potential
Catherine Truitt, State Superintendent (2021–present)

General election

Commissioner of Agriculture

Incumbent Commissioner Steve Troxler, a Republican, is eligible to run for a sixth term.

Democratic primary

Republican primary

Candidates

Potential
Steve Troxler, Commissioner of Agriculture (2005–present)

General election

Commissioner of Labor
Incumbent Commissioner Josh Dobson, a Republican, is eligible to run for a second term, but announced in 2022 that he would not run for reelection.

Democratic primary

Republican primary

Candidates

Declared
Jon Hardister, state representative (2013–present)
Ben Moss, state representative (2021–present)

Declined
Josh Dobson, Commissioner of Labor (2021–present)

General election

Commissioner of Insurance

Incumbent Commissioner Mike Causey, a Republican, is eligible to run for a third term.

Democratic primary

Republican primary

Candidates

Potential
Mike Causey, Commissioner of Insurance (2017–present)

General election

Notes

References

External links 
NC State Board of Elections

Council of State
2024
North Carolina Council of State